Carlos Manuel Dias Saavedra (born 1 February 1981) is a Portuguese former footballer who played as a central midfielder.

Club career
Saavedra was born in Lisbon. During his Portuguese career, spent mainly in the lower leagues, he represented G.D. Estoril Praia, S.U. Sintrense, F.C. Barreirense, C.D. Trofense, Odivelas FC, GS Loures, SG Sacavenense (two spells), União de Santarém and União Desportiva Alta de Lisboa. In 2008, he signed a two-year contract with Doxa Katokopias FC from Cyprus.

Saavedra continued in the country after two seasons, joining AEK Larnaca FC who immediately loaned him to his previous club. In the summer of 2014, after one year in Greece with Glyfada FC, the 33-year-old returned to his homeland.

References

External links

1981 births
Living people
Portuguese footballers
Footballers from Lisbon
Association football midfielders
Liga Portugal 2 players
Segunda Divisão players
G.D. Estoril Praia players
S.U. Sintrense players
F.C. Barreirense players
C.D. Trofense players
Odivelas F.C. players
GS Loures players
Cypriot First Division players
Doxa Katokopias FC players
AEK Larnaca FC players
Ermis Aradippou FC players
Nea Salamis Famagusta FC players
Football League (Greece) players
A.O. Glyfada players
Portuguese expatriate footballers
Expatriate footballers in Cyprus
Expatriate footballers in Greece
Portuguese expatriate sportspeople in Cyprus
Portuguese expatriate sportspeople in Greece